John Kirkby (29 November 1929 – 4 April 1953) was an American soccer playerer who played in the Football League for Stoke City and Wrexham.

Career
Kirkby became Stoke City's first overseas player, having been born in the United States, when he played his only game for Stoke against Middlesbrough in April 1949. He joined Wrexham in 1951. In a Cheshire County League match versus Crewe Alexandra Reserves on 4 April 1953, Kirkby collapsed in the 65th minute and was declared dead upon arrival in the hospital.

Career statistics
Source:

References

External links
 

1929 births
1953 deaths
American soccer players
Stoke City F.C. players
Wrexham A.F.C. players
English Football League players
Association football defenders
Association football players who died while playing
Sport deaths in Wales
American expatriate soccer players
Expatriate footballers in England
American expatriate sportspeople in England